The Litsitsirupa Private Nature Reserve is a nature reserve  north-east of Pretoria on the western side of the R567 Regional Route. It includes zebra, impala, kudu, blue wildebeest, giraffe, and more.

References 

Litsitsirupa